Noël Denholm-Young (5 January 1904 – 30 June 1975) was an English historian. He was a Fellow and archivist of Magdalen College, Oxford specialising in the political history of late medieval England. He worked as keeper of Western manuscripts at the Bodleian Library in Oxford, and later in the faculty of the University College of North Wales, Bangor. Among his publications was an edition of the chronicle Vita Edwardi Secundi.

He was born in Liverpool to John and Mira Denholm-Young.  He matriculated at Keble College, Oxford, in 1923.  He gained a second class degree in history BA (1926).  This became an MA and BLitt in 1930.  He transferred to Christ Church College, where he was senior scholar (1928–30).  The following year he was fellow by examination at Magdalen, and special election (1933–1946).  Suffering from ill-health, he moved to UC of North Wales at Bangor to be senior lecturer.  Magdalen has his archive papers of letters and correspondence.

Select publications
editor E M Snodgrass

References

British medievalists
Bodley's Librarians
Academics of Bangor University
1904 births
1975 deaths